Events in the year 2023 in Botswana.

Incumbents
 President: Mokgweetsi Masisi
 Vice President: Slumber Tsogwane
 Speaker of the National Assembly: Phandu Skelemani
 Chief Justice of Botswana: Terence Rannowane

Events

Ongoing — COVID-19 pandemic in Botswana

Deaths

9 January – Lesego Motsumi, politician (born 1964).

References

 
2020s in Botswana
Years of the 21st century in Botswana
Botswana
Botswana